Yvonne Ingdal (born 10 December 1939) is a Danish actress. She has appeared in 22 films and televisions shows between 1963 and 1974. She starred in the 1964 film To, which was entered into the 15th Berlin International Film Festival.

Selected filmography
 Suddenly, a Woman! (1963)
 To (1964)
 4x4 (1965)
 Once There Was a War (1966)
 Elvira Madigan (1967)
 Story of Barbara (1967)
 Kisses Right and Left (1969)
 Love Is War (1971)
 Tatort:  (1971)

References

External links

1939 births
Living people
Danish film actresses
Danish television actresses